Parliament House may refer to:

Australia
 Parliament House, Canberra, Parliament of Australia
 Parliament House, Adelaide, Parliament of South Australia
 Parliament House, Brisbane, Parliament of Queensland
 Parliament House, Darwin, Parliament of the Northern Territory
 Parliament House, Hobart, Parliament of Tasmania
 Parliament House, Melbourne, Parliament of Victoria
 Parliament House, Perth, Parliament of Western Australia
 Parliament House, Sydney, Parliament of New South Wales

Other countries
 National Parliament House, Bangladesh
 Parliament House, Helsinki, Finland
 Parliament House of Ghana
 Parliament House, Grenada
 Alþingishúsið, Iceland
 Parliament House (India)
 Parliament House, Dublin, Ireland
 Parliament House (Malta)
 Parliament House, Wellington, New Zealand
 Parliament House Islamabad, Pakistan
 Parliament House, Edinburgh, Scotland
 Parliament House, Singapore
  Parliament House, Malaysia 
 Parliament House, Stockholm, Sweden
 Parliament House, Dodoma, Tanzania
 Parliament House, Tonga
 Parliament House, Harare, Zimbabwe
 Parliament House (hotel), a gay resort in Florida, United States

See also
Houses of Parliament (disambiguation)
Houses of Parliament (Palace of Westminster), the two houses of the Parliament of the United Kingdom
Irish Houses of Parliament, Dublin
Old Parliament House (disambiguation)
Owain Glyndŵr's Parliament House, Machynlleth, Wales
Parliament buildings (disambiguation)
Parliament Square (disambiguation)
Legislative building